Three ships of the Royal Navy have been named HMS Donegal, after the failed French attempt to land in County Donegal in 1798:

  was a 76-gun third rate, previously the French ship Hoche.  She was captured in 1798 and commissioned into the Navy as HMS Donegal.  She was broken up in 1845.
  was a 101-gun first rate  launched in 1858. She became part of the torpedo and mining school ship  in 1886 and was sold in 1925.
  was a  armoured cruiser launched in 1902.  She served in the First World War and was sold for scrap in 1920.

References

Lyon, D. & Winfield, R. The Sail & Steam Navy List, London (2004): Chatham Publishing. 

Royal Navy ship names